Armen Movsisyan (Արմեն Մովսիսյան) (13 January 1962 – 21 September 2015) was the Minister of Energy and Natural Resources of Armenia (2001–2014).

He was born in Kapan and died from cancer on 21 September 2015 in Germany, aged 53.

References

1962 births
2015 deaths
Deaths from cancer in Germany
People from Kapan
Ministers of Energy Infrastructures and Natural Resources of Armenia